Hough Township is an inactive township in New Madrid County, in the U.S. state of Missouri.

Hough Township was established in 1903, and named after Bottoly Hough, a businessperson in the local cooperage industry.

References

Townships in Missouri
Townships in New Madrid County, Missouri